IEEE Communications Surveys & Tutorials is a quarterly peer-reviewed academic journal published by the IEEE Communications Society for tutorials and surveys covering all aspects of the communications field. The journal publishes both original articles and reprints of articles featured in other IEEE Communication Society journals. It was established in 1998 and the current editor-in-chief is Dusit (Tao) Niyato (Nanyang Technological University).

References

External links
 
 IEEE Communications Society

Communications Surveys and Tutorials
Quarterly journals
English-language journals
Publications established in 1998
Communication journals